Flore may refer to:

People 
 Flore (given name) a given name (including a list of people with the name)
 Flore (photographer) (born 1963), French-Spanish photographer
 Jeanne Flore, author, or the pseudonym for a group of authors, of the Contes amoureux, an early 1540s collection of seven tales
 Tristan Flore (born 1995), French table tennis player

Other uses 
 French ship Flore, eight French Navy ships
 Flore, Northamptonshire, a village and civil parish
 a title character in the 1796 ballet Flore et Zéphire
 Prix de Flore, a French literary prize established in 1994

See also
 Le Flore (disambiguation), including LeFlore and Leflore
 Flora (disambiguation)
 Flores (disambiguation)